In Case You Didn't Know is the second studio album by English singer-songwriter Olly Murs, released on 25 November 2011, through Epic Records. The album's release was preceded by the number-one singles "Heart Skips a Beat" on 19 August 2011, and "Dance with Me Tonight", on 20 November 2011. The album's track listing was confirmed by Digital Spy on 7 October 2011. The album debuted at number 1 on the UK Albums Chart, marking Murs' first chart topper.

Background
In June 2011, it was heavily rumoured that Murs had begun working on his second studio album. In the same month, Murs confirmed that he had been back in the studio, and that he was creating an album with a different approach to the first, stating that he wanted to explore all kinds of music. He commented: "I'm secretly not a bad rapper, and I really like to do a bit of beatboxing. Eminem has always been a favourite, but Vanilla Ice's "Ice Ice Baby" is a classic." On 27 August, during an interview with Digital Spy, Murs stated and that he was looking to create an album that was gracious of his roots.

Singles

 "Heart Skips a Beat" – In July 2011, Murs unveiled the album's lead single, "Heart Skips a Beat", a collaboration with Brit-hop duo Rizzle Kicks. The single was released on 19 August 2011, peaking at #1 on the UK Singles Chart and #6 on the Irish Singles Chart. The single sold more than 109,000 units on the week of release, becoming his fastest selling single ever. For release in the United States, the track was remixed to feature Chiddy Bang. The single was released on 29 May 2012 in the United States. It charted on the Billboard Hot 100 at #96 and #25 on the Billboard Pop Songs chart.
 "Dance with Me Tonight" – In September 2011, Murs premiered a thirty-second clip from the album's second single, "Dance With Me Tonight", and stated that the single was due for release on 20 November 2011. The music video premiered days later, featuring Murs being arrested after pursuing a prospective love interest. The single debuted at #2 on the UK Singles Chart, (kept off by Rihanna's "We Found Love") and then reached #1 two weeks later and to date, has sold more copies than any other of Murs' singles.
 "Oh My Goodness" – "Oh My Goodness" was released as the album's third single on 1 April 2012. The music video for the track premiered later that month, featuring Murs chasing a prospective love interest through a shopping center. The track reached number 13 on the UK Singles Chart. The single was released in Germany on 10 August 2012, as the album's second single in the country, peaking at #23 on the German Singles Chart

Tour
In February and March 2012, Murs did an arena tour of the UK and Ireland.

Set list
"Anywhere Else"
"Change Is Gonna Come"
"Thinking of Me"
"Tell the World"
"On My Cloud"/"I Need a Dollar"
"This Song Is About You"
"Busy"
"I'm OK"
"I Don't Love You Too"
"Just Smile"
"In Case You Didn't Know"
"It Must Be Love"
"Play Off"
"One Step Beyond"
"Dance With Me Tonight"
"Oh My Goodness"
"I Need You Now"
"Sex Machine"
"Papa's Got a Brand New Bag"
"Get Up Offa That Thing"
"I Got You (I Feel Good)"
"Heart on My Sleeve"
"Please Don't Let Me Go"

Encore
"Heart Skips a Beat"

Shows

Commercial performance
In Case You Didn't Know entered the UK Albums Chart at number-one with first week sales of over 148,000 copies, dethroning Rihanna's Talk That Talk album from that position, becoming Murs' first album to top the chart. On 9 December 2011, the album was certified Platinum by the British Phonographic Industry for shipments of 300,000 copies in the UK. The album debuted at number six and peaked at number two on the Irish Albums Chart, marking it Murs' first album to chart within the top ten and highest-peaking album. As of November 2018, the album has sold 1.12 million in the United Kingdom.

Track listing

Charts and certifications

Weekly charts

Year-end charts

Decade-end charts

Certifications

Release history

References

2011 albums
Olly Murs albums
Epic Records albums
Albums produced by Jim Eliot
Albums produced by Steve Robson